The Bishop of Bedford is an episcopal title used by a Church of England suffragan bishop who, under the direction of the Diocesan Bishop of St Albans, oversees 150 parishes in Luton and Bedfordshire.

The title, which takes its name after the town of Bedford, was created under the Suffragan Bishops Act 1534. The first three suffragan bishops were appointed for the Diocese of London, but through reorganisation within the Church of England in 1914, Bedford came under the Diocese of St Albans.

Richard Atkinson, formerly Archdeacon of Leicester, was consecrated by Rowan Williams, Archbishop of Canterbury, in St Paul's Cathedral on 17 May 2012.

History
With the huge increase in London's population in the 19th century, the Bishop of London was one of the first to require help from other bishops. Alongside assistant bishops (including some returned from the colonies; see Assistant Bishop of London, he gradually resumed appointments to suffragan Sees — Bedford was first in 1879. That See was chosen as the one erected by the Suffragan Bishops Act 1534 nearest to London; and the stipend of the bishop was provided by appointing him to St Andrew Undershaft, in the east of the City of London. The suffragan was always intended to take responsibility for the East End; by 1887 this meant the rural deaneries of Spitalfields, of Hackney and of Stepney. To these were added the rural deaneries of Islington, Shoreditch, St Sepulchre (the part outside the City), and Enfield in 1888, such that the bishop's area became known as "East and North London" — i.e. the East and North of the then-County of London (inside the diocese). Billing called himself Bishop-Suffragan for East London, and this responsibility passed to the Bishop of Stepney (which See was newly-erected under the Suffragans Nomination Act 1888) on Billing's resignation of his London duties in 1895. How was resident at Stainforth House, Upper Clapton by 1887; Billing was still residing there in 1895.

List of the Bishops of Bedford

References

External links
 Crockford's Clerical Directory - Listings

Bishops of Bedford
Bedford
Diocese of St Albans